Oakenshaw railway station was located about two miles south-east of Wakefield, West Yorkshire, England.  It was opened in 1840 by the North Midland Railway on its line from Derby to Leeds.

Originally built to serve Wakefield by omnibus, it had suitably ornate buildings, but was closed by the Midland Railway in 1870 when the station at Sandal and Walton was opened instead.

References

Disused railway stations in Wakefield
Railway stations in Great Britain opened in 1840
Railway stations in Great Britain closed in 1870
Former Midland Railway stations
Crofton, West Yorkshire